The Campagne des banquets (banquet campaign) were political meetings during the July Monarchy in France which destabilized the King of the French Louis-Philippe. The campaign officially took place from 9 July 1847 to 25 December 1847, but in fact continued until the February 1848 Revolution during which the Second Republic was proclaimed. During this campaign, the Republican triptych Liberté, égalité, fraternité resurfaced, for example in Lille with Ledru-Rollin.

The Banquets were private political meetings which were a way to turn around the 1835 Act prohibiting public assemblies. The first session was in Paris on 9 July 1847, and progressively spread to all of the French provinces. The prohibition of one of these meetings by François Guizot's cabinet, supposed to take place on 14 January 1848 in the 12th arrondissement of Paris, and then of another one set up for 22 February 1848, were the immediate cause of the riots which led to Louis-Philippe's abdication.

Origins 
The 1846-1848 economic crisis favored the opposition, who progressively united itself. After the reforms obtained during the parliamentary session of 1847, such as the lowering of the cens tax to 100 Francs in March, the prohibition of the cumulation of administrative public offices with deputies' seat, Guizot's cabinet became more authoritarian. In preparation of the 1847-1848 parliamentary session, Louis-Philippe prohibited the meetings of the democrat, republican and liberal opposition. The more liberal of the Orleanists gathered behind Adolphe Thiers claimed a more parliamentary regime, and joined force with the Left.

The campaign 

The moderate left-wing opposition used these banquets as occasions to organize themselves and to claim for a reform of the electoral law and a larger enfranchisement. 70 Banquets attended by 17,000 persons took place from July 1847 to February 1848, in all of the country. Three days before the opening of the parliamentary session, on 25 December 1847, the campaign was officially stopped. But the King's speech on 28 December and his declared opposition to any reform relaunched the Campaign, with a solemn address being sent to the King.

The prohibition of the 22 February 1848 banquet in honor of the birthday of George Washington (the United States of America being a symbol of democracy at the time) and the unrest which followed triggered the 1848 Revolution by a union of the popular Republicans and the liberal Orleanists, who turned their back on Louis-Philippe.

Influence 

The 1848 Campaign of Banquets was used as a model for the opposition to the Tsar Nicholas II, in 1904-1905, where it was a cause of the 1905 Russian Revolution.

Cultural depictions
The Banquets are mentioned several times in Gustave Flaubert's 1869 novel Sentimental Education:

References 

July Monarchy
1847 in France